Ellen Horn (born Ellen Stoesen, 1 February 1951) is a Norwegian actress, theatre director, and politician for the Labour Party.

Career 
Horn started as a puppet actor at Oslo Nye Teater (1969–70), and was educated at the Teaterhøyskolen (1972–75), and since the late 1980s has been one of the most central and prominent figures in Norwegian theater. As an actress, she has distinguished herself by her versatility; as director at the Nationaltheatret (1992-2000), she managed to turn a money-losing company with a highly turbulent business culture into a thriving theater both financially and artistically. Horn has been an associate of Norsk Rikskringkasting and Nationaltheatret, and is currently director of Riksteatret.

Horn further developed and consolidated the Ibsen Festival, and led the Nationaltheatret through its 100th anniversary in 1999. On that occasion, she was appointed Commander of the Order of St. Olav. During Stoltenberg's First Cabinet she was Minister of Culture (2000-2001).

After leaving the cabinet, Horn returned to the Nationaltheatret as an actor, and in recent years she has toured with the theater productions Undset and Jeg kunne gråte blod (about Marie and Knut Hamsun). Both as theater director and as minister, she was met by doubts and questions whether she was qualified enough to undertake such large tasks, but she put most of the skepticism to shame with her hard and focused work and her pragmatic attitude, and by growing with the new roles.

Private life 
Horn was married (1988) to the Norwegian Jazz drummer Jon Christensen (1943-2020), and she has two children: theater director Kjersti Horn (b. 1977, from her marriage (1973–81) to scenographer Per Kristian Horn, b. 1941), and singer and actress Emilie Stoesen Christensen (b. 1986) from her current marriage.

Honors 
Commander of the Order of St. Olav in 1999

Selected acting roles

Theater
Sigrid Undset in Undset (Trøndelag Teater 2005)

Film
 1976: Oss as Vera
 1985: Adjø solidaritet (Farewell Illusions) as Margrete

References

Notes

External links 
Ellen Horn Biography - SNL.no Store Norske Leksikon (in Norwegian)
Ellen Horn at Stortinget (in Norwegian)

1951 births
Living people
Labour Party (Norway) politicians
Actresses from Oslo
Actresses from Montreal
Politicians from Oslo
Politicians from Montreal
Ministers of Culture of Norway
Norwegian theatre directors
Women government ministers of Norway
Norwegian stage actresses
Norwegian actor-politicians